Lola Anderson (born 16 April 1998) is a British rower. She won a gold medal in the quadruple sculls at the 2022 European Rowing Championships.

References

External links

1998 births
Living people
British female rowers
European Rowing Championships medalists
21st-century British women
World Rowing Championships medalists for Great Britain